Historically, Białystok has been a destination for internal and foreign immigration, especially from Central and Eastern Europe. In addition to the Polish minority, there was a significant Jewish majority in Białystok. According to Russian census of 1897, out of the total population of 66,000, Jews constituted 41,900 (around 63% percent). World War II changed all of this, in 1939, ca. 107,000 persons lived in Białystok, but in 1946 – only 56,759, and to this day there is much less ethnic diversity than in the previous 300 years of the city's history. Currently the city's population is 97% Polish, 2.5% Belarusian and 0.5% of a number of minorities including Russians, Lipka Tartars, Ukrainians and Romani. Most of the modern day population growth is based on internal migration and urbanization.

The largest population in Białystok occurred in 2020 as reported by GUS 297 585 people.

National minorities

Belarusians

Białystok is a center of culture and society of Belarus (according to the census, they are almost 7,500, which represents 2.5% of residents of Białystok).  There is a Belarus Consulate in the city, and organizations exist such as the Belarusian Social and Cultural Association, the Belarusian Youth Union, the Union of Belarus to Poland, the Belarusian Association of Literary Bialowieza, Belarusian Historical Society, Belarusian Association of Journalists, Belarusian Students Association, Center for Civic Education, Poland-Belarus, Society of Belarusian Culture.

Bialystok also hosts cultural events such as nationwide Festival "Belarusian Song" and Day of Belarusian Culture. Belarus Radio Right is based in the city and transmits radio programming to Belarus. There are a number of Belarusian-language newspapers: Niwa, Belarusian Historical Papers, Pravincyja and Czasopis.

Russians
Russians are a minority, they are scattered around the territory of Poland but mostly reside in eastern Poland. There are 3244 Russians in Poland, living mainly in Białystok and the surrounding region, according to the 2002 census. The HFHR estimated around 13,000-15,000 Russians are in Poland. In Białystok, the main organization of work - Russian Cultural and Educational Association, organizing the Days of Russian Culture.

Tatars

The Lipka Tatar origins can be traced back to the descendant states of the Mongol Empire of Genghis Khan - the White Horde, the Golden Horde, the Crimean Khanate and Kazan Khanate. They initially served as a noble military caste but later they became urban-dwellers known for their crafts, horses and gardening skills. Throughout centuries they resisted assimilation and kept their traditional lifestyle. While they remained very attached to their religions, over time however, they lost their original Tatar language and for the most part adopted Polish.

After the annexation of eastern Poland into the Soviet Union following World War II, Poland was left with only 2 Tatar villages, Bohoniki and Kruszyniany. A significant number of the Tartars in the territories annexed to the USSR repatriated to Poland and clustered in or near Białystok.
In Poland, the Tatar population reached approximately 100,000 in 1630 but the 2002 census showed only 447 people declaring this ethnicity.

In 1925 the Muslim Religion Association (Muzułmański Związek Religijny) was formed in Białystok. In 1992, the Organization of Tatars of the Polish Republic (Związek Tatarów Rzeczypospolitej Polskiej) with autonomous branches in Białystok and Gdańsk began operating. The Białystok branch issues a magazine called Life Tatar. The plan is to establish in Bialystok an 'Institute for the History of the Tartars.

Other nationalities

In Bialystok there are other minorities: 
 Romani  -  Emigration of Polish Romani to Germany in the late 1980s reduced Poland's Romani population by as much as 75 percent. In Białystok the Central Council of Roma work in Poland, and publish a monthly magazine, Rromano po Drom
 Ukrainians -  According to the census 417 Ukrainians live in Białystok, There are two civic societies in the city, the Association of Ukrainians of Podlasie and Association of Independent Ukrainian Youth.

References

Demographics of Poland
Białystok
Podlaskie Voivodeship